Miltach is a municipality in the district of Cham, which is located in Bavaria, Germany.

References

Cham (district)